Rampurhat is a city and a municipality in Birbhum district in the Indian state of West Bengal.
It is the headquarters of the Rampurhat subdivision. According to Census 2011 Rampurhat is the third most populous city in Birbhum district and 82nd most populous city in West Bengal. Rampurhat is a rapidly growing township It is near the West Bengal / Jharkhand border. Rampuhat is an important city of Birbhum district as it has dynamic connectivity with the other places of West Bengal and neighboring states via state highways, national highway and rail route. Rampurhat Junction is one of the busiest railway stations in eastern India.

Geography

Location
Rampurhat is located at 24.17 North and 87.78 East.

Police station
Rampurhat police station has jurisdiction over Rampurhat municipality and Rampurhat I CD Block.

CD block HQ
The headquarters of Rampurhat I CD block are located at Rampurhat.

Overview
The northern portion of Rampurhat subdivision (shown in the map alongside) is part of the Nalhati Plains, a sub-micro physiographic region, and the southern portion is part of the Brahmani-Mayurakshi Basin, another sub-micro physiographic region occupying the area between the Brahmani in the north and the Mayurakshi in the south. There is an occasional intrusion of Rajmahal Hills, from adjoining Santhal Parganas, towards the north-western part of the subdivision. On the western side is Santhal Parganas and the border between West Bengal and Jharkhand can be seen in the map. Murshidabad district is on the eastern side. A small portion of the Padma River and the border with Bangladesh (thick line) can be seen in the north-eastern corner of the map. 96.62% of the population of Rampurhat subdivision live the rural areas and 3.38% of the population live in the urban areas.

Note: The map alongside presents some of the notable locations in the area. All places marked in the map are linked in the larger full screen map.

Demographics

As of the 2011 census Rampurhat had a total population of 57,833, of whom 29,611 were male and 28,222 were female.

Economics & Tourism

The town is known for stone crushers and mines, which are situated on the Bengal - Jharkhand border (most are in Jharkhand). This belt provides employment to a wide range of people from all over Birbhum District and Santhal Pargana. There are almost 350 crushers installed.

Tourism is an industry in Rampurhat and the adjacent temple town Tarapith area. Hundreds of hotels were established there for people with religious interest.
 
Tarapith is situated almost 9 km from Rampurhat township.

Civic administration

There is a Rampurhat municipality. It is divided into 18 wards.
The chairperson is Tinku Bhakat.

Education

The major schools for higher studies include Rampurhat Jitendralal Vidyabhavan, the best school in Birbhum district (estd. in 1955, co-educational after 10 standard), Rampurhat High School (the oldest of Rampurhat, established in 1886), Rampurhat Girls' High School (estd. in 1900), and Rampurhat High School for Girls. The schools follow WB Board.

The Heritage School, Bithika Pally, Rampurhat & St Pauls International School is a CBSE affiliated school in the sub-division. St. Paul's School is affiliated to CISCE, having ICSE and ISC. It is a co-educational school imparting studies in English.  Pre Schools are Kidzee & Heritage Hurray . Other important schools are [./Https://gurukulps.in/ Gurukul Public School is affilaliated to CBSE] Rampurhat Railway Adarsha Vidyamandir (HS) and more than 17 primary schools. Upcoming Schools are Delhi Public School and St. Xavier Public School .

There is one degree college - Rampurhat College. There is one medical college, Rampurhat Government Medical College and Hospital. There is the Rampurhat Government Nursing College. There is one engineering college, Rampurhat Government Polytechnic. There are two teacher training colleges - Gurukul Teachers Training centre and Rampurhat Teachers Training College. There are many computer educational centres in Rampurhat.

Culture

Rampurhat is known for cultural activities. A number of schools teach music, dance, recitation and drama. Every year during Dol Utsab, a big programme is arranged in Netaji Subhas Muktomancha, involving multiple cultural performance groups. Rabindra Jayanti is celebrated in the town participated by many cultural groups from different localities. During Saraswati Puja, cultural programmes are organized in the schools. The local tribal people, mostly Santhals, frequently arrange for programmes representing their cultural aspects.Railway Auditorium and Raktakarabi Puro Mancha are the leading auditoriums. Town Hall is also a place where small programmes are organized.
A new multiplex is coming in the city.

Magic as an art is patronized by Magician Indranil Ray  of this town. Annual Magic Programme is conducted in the town where magicians from different parts of West Bengal and other states participate.

Rampurhat Sangeet Samaj is a proactive cultural and social service organization based out of the town.

Transport

Rampurhat is well connected with Kolkata and other cities of West Bengal and India by railways and bus services.

Many mail, express, superfast and passenger trains pass through and originate from the Rampurhat Junction railway station. Train service are available from Rampurhat to Kolkata, Chennai, Coimbatore, Bengaluru, Hyderabad, New Jalpaiguri, Agartala, Guwahati, Delhi, Surat, Dhanbad, Patna, Ranchi, Visakhapatnam, Thiruvananthapuram, Bhubaneswar, Ernakulam etc. The junction connects Rampurhat with Dumka - Deoghar - Jasidih.

Major National Highway passes through the city are NH 14 and NH 114A. There is a SBSTC Bus Depot in the city. Bus services are available from Rampurhat to Kolkata (Esplanade/Karynamoyee), Siliguri, Asansol, Durgapur, Burdwan, Suri, Bolpur Shantiniketan, Balurghat, Berhampore, Krishnanagar, Malda, Raiganj, Lalgola, Bankura, Puruliya, Arambag, Dankuni, Chinsurah, Digha, Kharagpur, Haldia, Jhargram, Falta, Barasat, Garia, Bakkhali, Kalyani, Habra, Dumka, Deoghar etc.

Rampurhat Helipad constructed for helicopter service for tourist purpose. Indian Air Force's Rampurhat Emergency Airport And Airbase station situated near Jharkhand - Bengal border of the city. Nearest airport of the city is Kazi Nazrul Islam Airport from where regular flight services are available to Kolkata, Delhi, Mumbai, Bengaluru, Hyderabad, Chennai etc.

Post office
Rampurhat has a delivery head post office, with PIN 731224. Non-delivery sub offices with the same PIN are Mahajanpatty PO, Nischintapur PO and Railpar Birbhum PO.

References

 

Cities and towns in Birbhum district